Lasva Parish was a rural municipality in southeastern Estonia. It was a part of Võru County. The municipality had a population of 1,811 (as of 1 October 2007) and covered an area of 172.14 km2, giving it a population density of 10.52 inhabitants/km2.

Settlements
Villages
Andsumäe - Hellekunnu - Husari - Kääpa - Kaku - Kannu - Kõrgessaare - Kühmamäe - Lasva - Lauga - Lehemetsa - Listaku - Madala - Mäessaare - Mõrgi - Nõnova - Noodasküla - Oleski - Otsa - Paidra - Pässä - Peraküla - Pikakannu - Pikasilla - Pille - Pindi - Puusepa - Rusima - Saaremaa - Sooküla - Tammsaare - Tiri - Tohkri - Tsolgo - Tüütsmäe - Villa - Voki-Tamme

References

External links

Former municipalities of Estonia